The Norwegian Football Cup is the main knockout cup competition in Norwegian football. It is run by the Football Association of Norway and has been contested since 1902, making it the oldest football tournament in the country. The tournament is commonly known as Cupen ("The Cup"), NM or NM Cup (NM Cupen), an acronym formed from Norgesmesterskap ("Norwegian Championship"). These terms are used to describe both the men's and women's competitions. The equivalent competition for women's teams is the Norwegian Women's Football Cup.

The Norwegian Football Cup is a national championship, meaning that while the Eliteserien may be the most prestigious competition to win, it is the winners of the Cup who are awarded the title "Norwegian football champions". This differs from, for example, English football, where the winners of the Premier League are the ones who become English champions.

Winners receive the King's trophy. Winners also qualify for the Europa Conference League second qualifying round and a place in the Mesterfinalen, the Norwegian super cup match. The current Norwegian champions and holders of the cup are Molde, who defeated Bodø/Glimt 1–0 in the 2022 final. Odd and Rosenborg are the most successful clubs with 12 titles each.

History
The first cup was played in 1902, and Oscar II presented the King's Cup to the inaugural tournament. This was an invitation tournament organised by Kristiania IF and the Norwegian Football Association, which was later given official status. Five teams joined the competition, and Odd reached the final without playing a match. Grane won the first Norwegian Cup after they defeated Odd 2–0 at Gamle Frogner Stadion, Kristiania. The first tournament who had official status at the time of the events was the 1904 Norwegian Cup and was won by Odd. In the beginning, the cup was open for county champions only. This continued until 1933, when the cup was opened for all clubs of a certain standing. League football began with the 1937–38 season, and Fredrikstad became the first team to win a domestic double by winning both the league and the cup in the same year. Due to the outbreak of World War II, the competition was not played between the 1940 and 1945 editions. The competition was not nationwide until 1963. 1963 was the first year clubs from Northern Norway were allowed to participate, this was due to a poor communication system in the northern parts of Norway and to the belief that the clubs in the three northern counties could not compete on the same level as the southern clubs (Bodø/Glimt - one of the two northern newcomers - did stay in the cup to the fourth round that year). Until 1963, teams from Northern Norway competed in their own Northern Norwegian Championships.

Before the 2004 cup final, NRK awarded the 1986 final between Tromsø and Lillestrøm with the title Tidenes Cupfinale (Best cup final ever), and ex-Rosenborg striker Gøran Sørloth with Tidenes Cuphelt (Best cup hero ever).

The final has been played at Ullevaal Stadion since the 1948 cup final.

Format

Overview
Before the proper rounds take place, two qualifying rounds are played in March and April. 176 clubs from tier 4 and 5 enter the first qualifying round and 44 of these advance to the first round where they are joined by 84 teams from tiers 1, 2 and 3.

The first round of the cup are played in April, around the same time as the Eliteserien season starts. The first two rounds are set up by the Norwegian Football Association, and the top flight teams are usually pitted against fairly weak amateur teams, often in rural areas, on the amateur team's home pitch. Early upsets, where an amateur team knocks a professional team out of the tournament do happen occasionally. For example, in 2012 the Eliteserien teams Sandnes Ulf and Sogndal were knocked out in the first round by the third division (fourth tier) teams Staal Jørpeland IL and Florø SK respectively. Even if the amateur team loses, squaring off against a professional team may well be the highlight of their season.
 
From the third round to the semi-final, matchups are drawn at random, the teams face off once, and the winner goes on to the next round. The final match is played at Ullevaal Stadium (national stadium) in November or December, and takes place near the end of the Norwegian football season.

The cup is very popular in Norway, and tickets for the final match are hard to get hold of, as the game usually sells out quickly. The supporters of the two teams playing in the final match are seated at the two short-ends of the pitch, while the more neutral supporters are seated by the long-ends. The match is also televised on national television.

Schedule
Most entrants from level 4 and all entrants from level 5 have to play to qualifying rounds to join the competition proper. Reserve teams of Eliteserien clubs, who are eligible to play in 2. divisjon (level 3) cannot enter. Depending on the number of reserve teams, the first round proper will be filled with the best clubs from level 4 until the number of teams from levels 1–4 is 84. Clubs from higher levels are then added in the first round, as per the table below. The months in which rounds are played are traditional, with exact dates subject to each year's calendar.

Tiebreaking
In all rounds, if a fixture result in a draw after normal time, the winner is settled by a period of extra time, and if still necessary, a penalty shootout. Earlier, fixtures resulting in a draw (after normal time) would go to a replay, played at the venue of the away team.

The first Cup Final to go to a replay was the 1945 final, between Lyn and Fredrikstad. The initial tie finished 1–1 and the first replay also finished 1–1. Lyn won the second replay 4–0. The only other time the final has taken three matches to settle was the 1965 final between Oslo rivals Skeid and Frigg (2–2, 1–1, 2–1). The last replayed final was the 1995 final, when Rosenborg and Brann fought a 1–1 draw. The replay saw Rosenborg win the Cup, with the score 3–1. The first final to be decided by a penalty shootout was the 2009 final between Molde and Aalesund. The score ended 1–1 after normal time and 2–2 after extra time. Aalesund won the final 5–4 on penalties.

Qualification for subsequent competitions

European football
Prior to 2020, the Cup winners qualified for the following season's UEFA Europa League (formerly named the UEFA Cup; from its launch in 1960 until 1998, they entered the now-defunct UEFA Cup Winners' Cup instead). Effecting from the 2020 Norwegian Cup, winners qualify for the UEFA Europa Conference League. This European place applies even if the team is relegated or is not in the Norwegian top flight. In the past, if the Cup winning team also qualified for the following season's Champions League or Europa League through their league position, then the losing Cup finalist were given this European berth instead. Norwegian Cup winners enter the Europa League at the second qualifying round. Losing finalists, if they haven't qualified for Europe via the league, began earlier, at the first qualifying round. From the 2015–16 UEFA Europa League season, however, UEFA does not allow the runners-up to qualify for the Europa League through the competition. If the winner – and until 2015, the runner-up –
has already qualified for Europe through their league position (with the exception of the UEFA Cup until 1998), the Cup berth was then given to the highest-place team in the league who has not yet qualified.

Mesterfinalen
The Cup winners also qualify for the following season's single-match Mesterfinalen, a season opener played against the previous season's Eliteserien champions (or the Eliteserien runners-up if the Cup winners also won the league – the double).

Finals

Key

Winners and finalists

Results by team
Since its establishment, the Norwegian Cup has been won by 27 different teams. Teams shown in italics are no longer in existence.

Records and statistics

Final

Team
Most wins: 12, joint record:
Odd (1903, 1904, 1905, 1906, 1913, 1915, 1919, 1922, 1924, 1926, 1931, 2000)
Rosenborg (1960, 1964, 1971, 1988, 1990, 1992, 1995, 1999, 2003, 2015, 2016, 2018)
Most consecutive wins: 4, joint record:
Odd (1903, 1904, 1905, 1906)
Lyn (1908, 1909, 1910, 1911)
Most appearances in a final: 21:
Odd (1902, 1903, 1904, 1905, 1906, 1908, 1909, 1910, 1913, 1915, 1919, 1921, 1922, 1924, 1926, 1931, 1937, 1960, 2000, 2002, 2014)
Most Final appearances without ever winning: 2, joint record: 
Urædd (includes Porsgrunds FC) (1904, 1911)
Sandefjord BK (1957, 1959)
Vard Haugesund (1962, 1975)
Haugar (1961, 1979)
Sarpsborg 08 (2015, 2017)
Haugesund (2007, 2019)
Most Final appearances without ever losing: 2, Aalesund (2009, 2011)
Most Final appearances without losing (streak): 7, Skeid (1954, 1955, 1956, 1958, 1963, 1965, 1974)
Biggest win: 7 goals: Fredrikstad 7–0 Haugar, (1961)
Most goals in a final: 8:
Strømsgodset 5–3 Fredrikstad (1969 Replay)
Most goals by a losing side: 3, joint record:
Odd: Lost 3–4 against Lyn (1909), drew 3–3 against Rosenborg but lost 2–3 the replay (1960)
Fredrikstad: Lost 3–5 against Strømsgodset (1969)
Viking: Drew 3–3 against Fredrikstad but lost 2–3 the replay (1984)
Most defeats: 9, joint record:
Odd (1902, 1908, 1909, 1910, 1921, 1937, 1960, 2002, 2014)
Brann (1917, 1918, 1950, 1978, 1987, 1988, 1995, 1999, 2011)

Individual
Most wins by player: 6, Jan «Jonas» Gulbrandsen (Skeid) (1954, 1955, 1956, 1958, 1963, 1965)
Most wins by manager: 6, Nils Arne Eggen (Rosenborg) (1971, 1988, 1990, 1992, 1995, 1999)
Most goals (one final): 4, André Krogsæter (Lillestrøm) (1985)
Most goals (one final, including replays): 5, Eldar Hansen (Rosenborg) (3 in 1960, 2 in 1960 replay)
Youngest Cup finalist: Fredrik Aursnes (Hødd), 16 years and 350 days (2012)
Oldest Cup winner: Hans Nordahl (Skeid), 40 years and 173 days (1958)
Oldest Cup finalist: Claus Reitmaier (Lillestrøm), 41 years and 234 days (2005)

All rounds
Highest attendance at Ullevaal Stadion: 36,000 at the 1949 final (Sarpsborg v. Skeid, 23 October 1949)

Women

Since 1978, an official cup for women's clubs has also been played. The women's cup final is usually played on a Saturday, the day before the men's cup final. The 1978 cup final between BUL and Trondheims-Ørn was the only Norwegian cup final to be decided on penalties.

Before the 2006 final, the Norwegian Football Association decided that the Women's final would be played at Bislett Stadium instead of Ullevaal Stadion, which caused some debate. The Football Association claimed that two matches over one weekend would cause too much wear on the Ullevaal pitch, while representatives for the clubs claimed that the move was discriminating against women's football. When the semi-finals of the 2006 cup were drawn, all 4 clubs boycotted the draw in a protest against the move.

External links
 Soccerway
 RSSSF archive

See also
List of Norwegian Football Cup finals

Notes and references

 
Cup
Norway
1902 establishments in Norway
Recurring sporting events established in 1902